Tapanila (Finnish) or Mosabacka (Swedish) is a railway station in the Tapanila district of Helsinki, Finland. It is located between the stations of Malmi and Puistola, along the main railroad track from Helsinki to Riihimäki, about 13 kilometres northeast from the Helsinki Central railway station.

The original station building at Tapanila has been moved to Pikku Huopalahti as a part of cultural heritage.

References

Railway stations in Helsinki